David Schramm may refer to:
David Schramm (astrophysicist) (1945–1997), American astrophysicist and educator
David Schramm (actor) (1946–2020), American actor
Dave Schramm (American football) (born 1963), American football offensive coordinator
Dave Schramm (musician) (fl. 1990s–2010s), American guitarist

See also 
Dávid Schram (born 1976), Hungarian musician and record producer